I, Danilo is a novel by Bosnian writer Derviš Sušić. It was released by Oslobođenje on 1 February 1960.

I, Danilo was adapted for the stage in 1964.

References

1960 novels
Fiction set in the 20th century
Bosnia and Herzegovina culture
Bosnia and Herzegovina literature
Historical novels
Novels set in Bosnia and Herzegovina
Novels set in Yugoslavia
Fictional Bosnian people